DaRico Travone Hines (born February 17, 1978) is an American basketball coach. He serves as player development coach of the Toronto Raptors of the National Basketball Association (NBA). He played college basketball with the UCLA Bruins.

College career 
Hines received a bachelor's degree in history from the University of California, Los Angeles, in 2002, with a minor in African-American studies.

Coaching career 

From 2006–2010 Hines worked as a player/athletic development assistant for the NBA's Golden State Warriors where he worked under then head coach Don Nelson.

From 2010–2015, he joined the St John's Red Storm as an Assistant Basketball Coach under Head Coach Steve Lavin.

On September 28, 2016, Hines was named assistant coach of the Reno Bighorns of the NBA Development League.

Personal life 

Hines married actress Tichina Arnold on August 18, 2012.  Arnold is best known for her role as Pamela James in the FOX sitcom Martin (1992–97). In January 2016, Tichina Arnold told People Magazine that she would be divorcing Hines, allegedly due to a scandal involving infidelity.
The media reported that Hines had been unfaithful to Arnold, having made a sex tape with another woman during their marriage, which was later released to the public without his consent.[21]

References

External links
UCLA bio

1978 births
Living people
Golden State Warriors assistant coaches
Reno Bighorns coaches
Sacramento Kings assistant coaches
St. John's Red Storm men's basketball coaches
UCLA Bruins men's basketball players
American men's basketball players